LNV Ligue A Masculine (LAM) is the top men's volleyball league in France, established in 1938. It is governed by the Ligue Nationale de Volley (LNV), an independent body that runs French professional volleyball under delegation from the French Volleyball Federation (FFVB).
Prior to adopting its current name in 2009, the league used to be known as Pro A, a name it shared with its basketball equivalent.

Teams

2021–22 season:

Arago de Sète
Cambrai Volley
AS Cannes
Chaumont VB 52
Montpellier HSC VB
Nantes Rezé MV
Narbonne Volley
Nice Volley-Ball
Paris Volley
Plessis Robinson VB
Toulouse Spacer's
Stade Poitevin
Tourcoing Lille
Tours VB

Former teams
AMSL Fréjus
Asnières Volley 92
Avignon Volley-Ball
Beauvais OUC
Grenoble Volley Université Club
Paris Université Club
Racing Club de France
Stade Français

Title holders

 1938 Amicale Paris (1)
 1939 Volley-Ball Club France (1)
 1940 Not held due to Battle of France
 1941 Paris UC
 1942 Occupied zone : RC France
 1942 Free zone : RC Cannes
 1943 Paris UC
 1944 Not completed
 1945 Stade Français
 1946 RC France
 1947 Montpellier UC
 1948 RC France
 1949 Montpellier UC
 1950 Montpellier UC
 1951 Montpellier UC
 1952 Stade Français
 1953 Stade Français
 1954 Billancourt
 1955 Billancourt
 1956 Billancourt (3)
 1957 Stade Français
 1958 Stade Français
 1959 BNCI Alger (1)
 1960 Stade Français
 1961 Stade Français
 1962 Paris UC
 1963 Paris UC
 1964 RC France
 1965 Asnières
 1966 Asnières
 1967 Paris UC
 1968 Paris UC
 1969 RC France
 1970 RC France
 1971 RC France
 1972 Montpellier UC
 1973 Montpellier UC
 1974 Stade Français (8)
 1975 Montpellier UC (7)
 1976 VGA Saint-Maur (1)
 1977 RC France
 1978 RC France (9)
 1979 Asnières
 1980 Asnières
 1981 AS Cannes
 1982 AS Cannes
 1983 AS Cannes
 1984 Asnières (6)
 1985 Grenoble (1)
 1986 AS Cannes
 1987 Fréjus
 1988 Fréjus
 1989 Fréjus
 1990 AS Cannes
 1991 AS Cannes
 1992 Fréjus (4)
 1993 PSG–Asnières
 1994 AS Cannes
 1995 AS Cannes
 1996 Paris UC
 1997 Paris UC
 1998 Paris UC (9)
 1999 Stade Poitevin Poitiers
 2000 Paris Volley
 2001 Paris Volley
 2002 Paris Volley
 2003 Paris Volley
 2004 Tours VB
 2005 AS Cannes (9)
 2006 Paris Volley
 2007 Paris Volley
 2008 Paris Volley
 2009 Paris Volley
 2010 Tours VB
 2011 Stade Poitevin Poitiers (2)
 2012 Tours VB
 2013 Tours VB
 2014 Tours VB
 2015 Tours VB
 2016 Paris Volley (9)
 2017 Chaumont VB 52 (1)
 2018 Tours VB
 2019 Tours VB (8)
 2021 AS Cannes (10)
 2022 Montpellier HSC VB (8)

See also
 LNV Ligue A Féminine

References

External links
Official website
 Ligue Nationale de Volley
 LNV Ligue A Masculine - volleybox.net  

France
Volleyball competitions in France
Volleyball
Sports leagues established in 1938
Professional sports leagues in France